is a Japanese ice hockey player. He competed in the men's tournament at the 1972 Winter Olympics.

References

External links
 

1947 births
Living people
Japanese ice hockey players
Olympic ice hockey players of Japan
Ice hockey players at the 1972 Winter Olympics
Sportspeople from Tochigi Prefecture
20th-century Japanese people
21st-century Japanese people